There were approximately 60,000 people of Hispanic or Latino origin in Portland, Oregon, as of 2020; about 10% of the city’s population.

The Portland metropolitan area has Oregon's largest Latino population. In 2022, Jamie Goldberg of The Oregonian wrote, "More than half of Oregon's Latino population lives in Multnomah, Washington and Marion counties. All three saw their Latino populations grow by at least 25% in the last decade. Washington County has the largest Latino population, 107,000 ... In Clackamas County, the Latino population grew by 38.5% in the last decade to more than 40,000 residents."

Culture 
Parts of 39th Avenue were named Cesar Chavez Boulevard in honor of Latino labor activist Cesar Chavez.

Milagro is the only Hispanic theater production company in the Pacific Northwest.

Events 
Annual events include the Cinco de Mayo festival and the Latin American Film Festival. Makers de Mayo "showcases and celebrates Latin American culture through art, makers, music, food and more", according to KPTV's Ayo Elise. PDX Latinx Pride (formerly Portland Latino Gay Pride) hosts the Latinx Pride Festival.

Cuisine 
Notable restaurants and bars known for serving Latin American cuisine have included:

 Andina
 Ataula (2013–2021)
 Bar Cala (2022)
 Birrieria La Plaza
 Birrieria PDX (2020)
 Cafe Azul
 El Cubo de Cuba
 El Gallo Taqueria (2009)
 Esparza's (1990–2014)
 The Goose (2014)
 Güero
 La Bonita
 La Calaca Comelona
 La Carreta Mexican Restaurant (1990–2020s)
 Lechon
 Masia (2020–2021)
 Mi Mero Mole (2011–2020)
 Mis Tacones
 Nuestra Cocina (2004)
 Original Taco House (1960–2017)
 Ox
 Palomar (2018)
 Pambiche Cocina and Repostería Cubana
 Papi Chulo's (2019)
 Por Que No (2004)
 República
 Tamale Boy
 Taqueria Los Puñales
 Teote (2013)
 Toro Bravo (2007–2020)
 Xico (2012)

The Portland Mercado is a collection of food carts in southeast Portland, focused on Latin American cuisine.

See also

 Ethnic groups in Portland, Oregon
 History of Chinese Americans in Portland, Oregon
 History of Korean Americans in Portland, Oregon
 History of the Japanese in Portland, Oregon

References

External links
 Hispanic & Latinx Culture at Travel Portland

 
Hispanic and Latino American history
History of Portland, Oregon